Valiulla Safiullovich Maksutov (18 September 1954 – 18 January 2023) was a Russian politician. He served in the Federation Council from July to November 1996.

Maksutov died in Moscow on 18 January 2023, at the age of 68.

References

1954 births
2023 deaths
20th-century Russian politicians
Members of the Federation Council of Russia (1996–2000)
People from Samara Oblast